Patricia is a hamlet in southern Alberta, Canada within the County of Newell.

Patricia is near Dinosaur Provincial Park, which is a UNESCO World Heritage Site.  It was named after Princess Patricia of Connaught.  

The Hamlet of Patricia was briefly famous in the 1970s when a local rancher Albert Ketchmark gifted then Prime Minister Pierre Trudeau a lot in the community as part of their mother's estate, as a joke.  The Prime Minister's ownership of the 50 by 130 foot lot became national news when the County of Newell noted Trudeau owed $3 in property tax and possibly another $3 in back taxes on the property. The Prime Minister's Office when asked about the situation stated they were unaware of the transfer and had not been supplied with a deed transfer or tax bill. The taxes were paid by Jim Nesbitt, the publisher of the local Brooks Bulletin and Liberal Party member, and Trudeau refused to accept ownership of the lot, even just to transfer it to the County. The matter was settled in Supreme Court of Alberta when Trudeau's lawyers argued the transfer amounted to an imperfect gift, and the Justice ruled the property title cancelled.

Demographics 

The population of Patricia according to the 2020 municipal census conducted by the County of Newell is 88.

See also 
List of communities in Alberta
List of designated places in Alberta
List of hamlets in Alberta

References 

Hamlets in Alberta
Designated places in Alberta
County of Newell